Penta-graphene is a hypothetical carbon allotrope composed entirely of carbon pentagons and resembling the Cairo pentagonal tiling. Penta-graphene was proposed in 2014 on the basis of analyses and simulations. Further calculations predicted that it is unstable in its pure form, but can be stabilized by hydrogenation. Due to its atomic configuration, penta-graphene has an unusually negative Poisson’s ratio and very high ideal strength believed to exceed that of a similar material, graphene.

Penta-graphene contains both sp2 and sp3 hybridized carbon atoms. Contrary to graphene, which is a good conductor of electricity, penta-graphene is predicted to be an insulator with an indirect band gap of 4.1–4.3 eV. Its hydrogenated form is called penta-graphane. It has a diamond-like structure with sp3 and no sp2 bonds, and therefore a wider band gap (ca. 5.8 eV) than penta-graphene. Chiral penta-graphene nanotubes have also been studied as metastable allotropes of carbon.

References

External links
 

Graphene
Allotropes of carbon
Hypothetical chemical compounds